Cai Weilian (1904–1939) was a Chinese painter.

Early life

Cai Weilian was born and raised in Shaoxing, Zhejiang; of Chinese philosopher Cai Yuanpei seven children, Weilian was reportedly his favourite. She studied oil painting in both Belgium and France.

Career
Cai specialised in modernist oil painting and became a professor at the Hangzhou-based National Academy of Art in 1928.

Later years
Cai Weilian married fellow artist Lin Wenzheng and relocated to Kunming, Yunnan. She died after childbirth in 1939.

References

1904 births
1939 deaths
People from Shaoxing
20th-century Chinese painters
Deaths in childbirth
Chinese women painters
Chinese art educators